Mandip Kaur Gill (born 5 January 1988) is an English actress. Her first television role came in 2012 when she was cast as Phoebe McQueen in the Channel 4 soap opera Hollyoaks. After departing the series in 2015, Gill went on to have guest roles in Cuckoo, Doctors, The Good Karma Hospital and Casualty. In October 2017, the BBC announced that Gill had been cast as companion Yasmin Khan in the 2018 series of Doctor Who. She has since appeared in every episode of Series 11, 12 and 13.

Early life
Gill was born in Leeds, West Yorkshire, on 5 January 1988. She is of Indian descent, and is a Sikh. Growing up in a council estate in the suburb of Middleton, where her parents owned a newsagents, she attended a primary school in the area before enrolling in Cockburn School. At fourteen, her family moved to Allerton Bywater, where she attended Brigshaw High School. She graduated from the University of Central Lancashire in 2009 with a BA (Hons) in Acting.
She attended Park Lane College where she studied Performing Arts.

Career
Gill appeared in several theatre productions, before landing her first television role as Phoebe Jackson (later McQueen) in the Channel 4 soap opera Hollyoaks. Gill had attended a number of auditions for the soap in the past, and she was unsure if the character of Phoebe was right for her, but after a number of callbacks, Gill was given the role. Phoebe was introduced as a homeless teenager and a friend for established character George Smith (Steven Roberts). Gill chose to leave the show in 2015 and Phoebe was killed off as part of the long-running "Gloved Hand Killer" storyline. The following year, Gill had a guest role in the BBC sitcom series Cuckoo, before appearing in Doctors for a five episode arc. Gill played Shazia Amin, a pregnant homeless woman. In 2017, Gill appeared in The Good Karma Hospital, and an episode of Casualty. She also appeared in Kay Mellor's BBC drama Love, Lies and Records as Talia, a junior registrar.

In October 2017, the BBC announced that Gill had been cast in the eleventh series of Doctor Who, as a companion to the Thirteenth Doctor, played by Jodie Whittaker, starting in 2018. Gill was joined by her former Hollyoaks colleague Tosin Cole, who plays Ryan Sinclair, another of the Doctor's companions. Gill continued to appear in the twelfth and thirteenth series, as well as a series of specials airing in 2022.

In May 2022, Gill made her West End theatre debut in the play 2:22 A Ghost Story.

Filmography

Film

Television

Theatre

Awards and nominations

References

External links

Living people
1988 births
21st-century English actresses
English television actresses
English soap opera actresses
Alumni of the University of Central Lancashire
Actresses from Leeds
British actresses of Indian descent
English people of Punjabi descent
English Sikhs